The 1979 European Cup was the seventh edition of the European Cup of athletics.

The "A" Finals were held in Turin, Italy. The first two teams qualified for the 1979 IAAF World Cup.

"A" Final
Held in Turin on 4 and 5 August.

Team standings

Results summary

Men's events

Women's events

"B" Final
The winners qualified for the "A" final.

Men
Held on 21 and 22 July in Karlovac, Yugoslavia

Women
Held on 21 July in Antony, France

Semifinals

Men
All semifinals were held on 30 June and 1 July. First two teams qualified for the "A" final (plus Italy as the host). Places 3–5 qualified for the "B" final.

Semifinal 1
Held in Lüdenscheid, West Germany

Semifinal 2
Held in Geneva, Switzerland

Semifinal 3
Held in Malmö, Sweden

Women

First two teams qualified for the "A" final (plus Italy as the host). Places 3–5 qualified for the "B" final.

Semifinal 1
Held in Sofia, Bulgaria, on 30 June

Semifinal 2
Held in Sittard, Netherlands, on 1 July

Semifinal 3
Held in Cwmbran, United Kingdom, on 1 July

Preliminary

Men
Preliminary round was held on 16 and 17 June in Luxembourg City. First three teams advanced to the semifinals.

References

European Cup results (Men) from GBR Athletics
European Cup results (Women) from GBR Athletics

1979
European Cup
European Cup
International athletics competitions hosted by Italy
Sports competitions in Turin
European Cup
1970s in Turin